Jamal Karimi-Rad (1956 – 28 December 2006) was the Minister of Justice of the Islamic Republic of Iran.

Early life
Rad was born in 1956.

Death
He was killed in a car accident near Salafjegan on 28 December 2006. Gholam-Hossein Elham became the acting justice minister after this event.

See also

 Ghorbanali Dorri-Najafabadi
 Mohammad Ismaeil Shooshtari

References

External links
 Press Cases Will Be Examined Urgently
 Iran denies execution by stoning

1956 births
2006 deaths
Government ministers of Iran
People from Alamut
Road incident deaths in Iran
Iranian prosecutors
Burials at Behesht-e Zahra